Jake Nicholas O'Connell (born November 6, 1985) is a former American football tight end. He played college football at Miami University. O'Connell was selected by the Kansas City Chiefs in the seventh-round in the 2009 NFL Draft.

O'Connell attended Gulf Coast High School in Naples, Florida and is the first Gulf Coast player ever drafted.

References

External links
Miami RedHawks bio 
Kansas City Chiefs bio

1985 births
Living people
Sportspeople from Naples, Florida
Players of American football from Florida
American football tight ends
Miami RedHawks football players
Kansas City Chiefs players